This article displays the rosters for the teams competing at the 2019 FIBA Women's Asia Cup. Each team had to submit 12 players.

Age and club as of 24 September 2019.

Group A

Chinese Taipei

India

Japan
The squad was announced on 11 September 2019.

South Korea

Group B

Australia
A 16-player squad was announced on 16 August 2019. The final squad was revealed on 21 September 2019.

China
The squad was announced on 22 September 2019.

New Zealand
The squad was announced on 16 September 2019.

Philippines
The squad was announced on 19 September 2019.

References

External links
Official website

Squads
FIBA Women's Asia Cup squads